Eia's Christmas at Phantom Owl Farm (also titled Eia's Christmas Mission) is a 2018 Estonian children's adventure film directed by Anu Aun.

The film's protagonist is a 10-year old girl Eia, who spends her Christmas holiday in the mysterious farmstead in Southern Estonia. In the farmstead she encounters several challenges and adventures, including rescuing an old primeval forest and finding her family's biggest secret.

Cast
Cast:
Paula Rits	as Eia
Siim Oskar Ots as Ats
Liis Lemsalu as Jete
Jaan Rekkor as	Ott
Märt Pius as Moorits
Priit Pius	as Laurits
Priit Võigemast as Oskar
Mirtel Pohla as Lilli
Anne Reemann as Juuli
Tõnu Oja as August
Tambet Tuisk as Kaarel
Juhan Ulfsak as Raiesmiku Raivo
Meelis Rämmeld as Traktori Pets
Marvin Inno as Robi
Annabrith Heinmaa as Sonja
Maria Annus as Sonja's mother
Robert Annus as Sonja's father
Riho Kütsar as Policeman

References

External links
 
 Eia's Christmas at Phantom Owl Farm, entry in Estonian Film Database (EFIS)

2018 films
Estonian children's films
Estonian-language films